Aslanhane Mosque is a 13th-century mosque in Ankara, Turkey.

Location
The mosque is in the old quarter of Ankara next to Ankara Castle.

History
Built during the reign of Mesud II of the Anatolian Seljuks in 1290, the mosque is one of the oldest mosques in Turkey still standing. Its architect was Ebubekir Mehmet. It was commissioned by two Ahi leaders named Hüsamettin and Hasaneddin. However, in 1330, it was repaired by another Ahi leader named Şerafettin after whom the mosque was named. After several minor repairs the mosque was restored by the Directorate General of Foundations in 2010-2013 term.

The building
The square-plan building with  area has one minaret. Its wooden roof is supported by 24 large wood columns. It has 3 gates and 12 windows The mihrab is decorated with Seljuk tiles. The building material is mostly spolia from earlier buildings.

Şerafettin's tomb is facing the mosque. There was a lion statue which was buried in the walls of Şerafettin's mosque. That's why the popular name of the mosque is Aslanhane meaning the house of the lion.

Gallery

References

Mosques in Ankara
Seljuk mosques in Turkey
Religious buildings completed in 1290
13th-century mosques
World Heritage Tentative List for Turkey